Last Session or variants may refer to:

Albums
 Last Session (Grant Green album), final album by American jazz guitarist Grant Green featuring performances recorded in 1978
 Last Session, album by Blind Willie McTell
 Last Session, concert DVD by Sting (singer) and Gil Evans
 Last Sessions (Lenny Breau album)
 Last Sessions (Mississippi John Hurt album) 1972
 Last Sessions, by Jelly Roll Morton
 Last Sessions: Their Complete Victor Recordings (1934–1941), a compilation of recordings made by American country music group the Carter Family
 Last Sessions, 1933 Jimmie Rodgers (country singer) (1897–1933), known as the "Singing Brakeman"
 The Last Session (Lee Morgan album)
 The Last Session: A Fond Farewell, an album containing Ronnie Drew's final recordings, released in November 2008
 The Last Session, album by Charlie Shavers
 The Last Session, album by Cursed (band)
 The Last Session, album by Gene Vincent
 The Last Sessions (Patsy Cline album)
 The Last Sessions (Sonny Stitt album)
 The Last Sessions, album by Ernie Henry
 Columbia Lane – the Last Sessions, an album released by Australian country music singer Slim Dusty
 Last Trio Session, album by jazz pianist Wynton Kelly recorded in 1968 and released on the Delmark label in 1988

Musical
The Last Session (musical), musical with book by Jim Brochu and music and lyrics by Steve Schalchlin

See also
The Final Sessions, by jazz pianist Elmo Hope which compiles sessions recorded in 1966